Mogo Inc. is a Vancouver-based company, founded in 2003 by David Marshall Feller. The company offers high interest loans, "identity fraud protection", mortgages, a Visa Prepaid Card, and credit score viewing through Equifax for select customers. Mogo had an initial public offering on the Toronto Stock Exchange in June 2015. In January 2016, Mogo made a deal with Postmedia to exchange a percentage of profits for free newspaper ads. In January 2017, the company began offering mortgages. 
In January 2021, Carta was acquired by Mogo Financial for 10 million Mogo shares valuing the transaction in excess of $100 million. CAD.

References 

Companies based in Vancouver
Companies listed on the Toronto Stock Exchange
Canadian companies established in 2003